The Aqua Line is a line of Noida Metro, a rapid transit system in Noida and Greater Noida in Uttar Pradesh, India. It consists of 21 metro stations from Sector 51 in Noida to Depot in Greater Noida.

The line has been operational since 25 January 2019. It was inaugurated by Chief Minister of Uttar Pradesh Yogi Adityanath.

Stations
The  Aqua Line has 21 stations. The entire route is on elevated track. This line has an interchange station with the Delhi Metro at Noida Sector 52 metro station. All stations are equipped with platform screen doors.

See also
 List of Noida Metro stations
 Delhi Metro
 Blue Line (Delhi Metro)

References

External links

 Delhi Metro Rail Corporation (Official site)
 Delhi Metro Annual Reports
 delhimetromaps.com - Descriptions of Noida Metro Aqua Line Route Map Details]
 UrbanRail.Net – descriptions of all metro systems in the world, each with a schematic map showing all stations.

Noida Metro
Rapid transit lines in India